

Arthropods

Newly named crustaceans

Newly named insects

Amphibians

Temnospondyls

Plesiosaurs

New taxa

Dinosaurs
 In the summer excavation resumed on the Talkeetna Mountains Hadrosaur, discovered in a quarry near the Glenn Highway, approximately 150 miles northeast of Anchorage.

Newly named dinosaurs
Data courtesy of George Olshevsky's dinosaur genera list.

Birds

Newly named birds

Pterosaurs

New taxa

Fossil eggs

New ootaxa

Footnotes

References
 Pasch, A. D., K. C. May. 2001. Taphonomy and paleoenvironment of hadrosaur (Dinosauria) from the Matanuska Formation (Turonian) in South-Central Alaska. In: Mesozoic Vertebrate Life. Ed.s Tanke, D. H., Carpenter, K., Skrepnick, M. W. Indiana University Press. Pages 219–236.

 
1990s in paleontology
Paleontology